Live at the Paramount is a live album released by Canadian rock group The Guess Who in 1972. It was recorded on May 22, 1972 at the Paramount Theatre in Seattle, Washington. Live at the Paramount was the first Guess Who album to feature Donnie McDougall on rhythm guitar and the last to feature original bassist Jim Kale. It also includes performances of 3 exclusive songs not included on any of their studio albums: "Glace Bay Blues," "Runnin' Back to Saskatoon," and "Truckin' Off Across the Sky."

The album reached #39 on the Billboard 200 album chart in the United States.  This was the group's only live album until the 'classic lineup' reunion in 1983 (resulting in the album Together Again, released the following year).

The 2000 re-release on Compact Disc was remixed and added six bonus tracks from the same concert which did not fit on LP. Four tracks from the show remain unreleased: "Get Your Ribbons On" (the original show opener); "Heartbroken Bopper"; "Guns, Guns, Guns"; and "Follow Your Daughter Home".

Track listing

Original album
Side one
"Albert Flasher" (Burton Cummings) - 2:31
"New Mother Nature" (Cummings) - 4:18
"Glace Bay Blues"  (Blair MacLean, Gary MacLean, Don McDougall) - 2:51
"Runnin' Back to Saskatoon" (Cummings, Kurt Winter) - 6:16
"Pain Train" (Cummings, Winter) - 6:10
Side two
"American Woman" (Randy Bachman, Cummings, Jim Kale, Garry Peterson) - 16:52
"Truckin' Off Across the Sky" (Cummings, Kale, McDougall, Peterson, Winter) - 7:03

2000 Buddha CD re-release
"Pain Train" (Cummings, Winter) - 7:00
"Albert Flasher" (Cummings) - 2:59
"New Mother Nature" (Cummings) - 4:26
"Runnin' Back to Saskatoon" (Cummings, Winter) - 6:52
"Rain Dance" (Cummings, Winter) - 2:53
"These Eyes" (Bachman, Cummings) - 4:29
"Glace Bay Blues" (Blair MacLean, Gary MacLean, Don McDougall) - 3:19
"Sour Suite" (Cummings) - 3:58
"Hand Me Down World" (Winter) - 3:53
"American Woman" (Bachman, Cummings, Kale, Peterson) - 16:53
"Truckin' Off Across the Sky" (The Guess Who) - 7:21
"Share the Land" (Cummings) - 4:46
"No Time" (Bachman, Cummings) - 6:06

Personnel
The Guess Who
Burton Cummings - lead vocals, rhythm guitar, keyboards, harmonica, flute
Kurt Winter - lead guitar, backing vocals
Donnie McDougall - rhythm guitar, acoustic guitar, backing vocals; lead vocals on "Glace Bay Blues"
Jim Kale - bass
Garry Peterson - drums

Additional personnel
Brian Christian - engineer
Dennis Smith - engineer
Jack Richardson - producer

Charts
Album

Singles

References

1972 live albums
The Guess Who albums
RCA Victor live albums
Live albums by Canadian artists